David Jeremiah (born February 13, 1941) is an American evangelical Christian author, founder of Turning Point Radio and Television Ministries and senior pastor of Shadow Mountain Community Church, a Southern Baptist megachurch in El Cajon, California, a suburb of San Diego.

Biography
David Paul Jeremiah was born in Toledo, Ohio in 1941 to Ruby and James T. Jeremiah. At age eleven, his family, which also included his three siblings, moved to Dayton, Ohio, when his father became the pastor of Emmanuel Baptist Church. Then in 1953, the family made the move to Cedarville, Ohio, when his father became the new president of Cedarville College (now Cedarville University).

Jeremiah earned his Bachelor of Arts degree from Cedarville College in 1963, and that same year he married his college sweetheart, Donna Thompson. He went on to receive a Master's degree in Theology from Dallas Theological Seminary (1967) and completed additional graduate work at Grace Seminary (1972). Cedarville presented him with an honorary Doctor of Divinity degree in 1981.

In 1969, Jeremiah founded Blackhawk Baptist Church in Fort Wayne, Indiana, and Blackhawk Christian School in 1973. That same year, he also developed and launched The Bible Hour, gaining experience with using televised mass-media to share the Gospel. In the 12 years he was senior pastor at Blackhawk, the congregation size grew from seven families to 1,300 members.

In 1981, the Jeremiah family, which now included four children, moved to Southern California, where David Jeremiah succeeded Tim LaHaye as the senior pastor at Scott Memorial Baptist Church (now Shadow Mountain Community Church). Jeremiah's leadership of the church has led it to become affiliated with the Southern Baptist Convention and expand to nine satellite locations that include Hispanic and Arabic congregations. The main campus of the church has become home to the Southern California Seminary and Christian Unified Schools of San Diego, a K-12 Christian school district.

In 1982, Jeremiah founded Turning Point for God, a multi-media broadcast ministry. With the mission to deliver the unchanging Word of God to an ever-changing world, Turning Point’s radio and television program began with local influence, developed national influence through television by 2000, and has since become an international leader in the world of broadcast ministry. Jeremiah has won numerous awards over the years through the Turning Point program, including the National Religious Broadcasters (NRB) Hall of Fame Award and the NRB President’s Award in 2020.

In 1994 and again in 1998, Jeremiah was diagnosed with lymphoma. In 1999, a nodule was surgically removed from his neck and he underwent stem cell transplant therapy. The story of his experiences during that season are recorded in his book, When Your World Falls Apart.

In addition to pastoring Shadow Mountain Community Church and leading Turning Point for God, Jeremiah is an author and speaks frequently at conferences, conventions, and universities, as well as at the chapels for professional basketball and football teams.

David and Donna Jeremiah have four grown children and are the grandparents of twelve grandchildren. Jeremiah’s oldest son, David Michael, is the president of  Turning Point and the anchor voice of the radio program. Jeremiah’s other son, Daniel, is a former NFL scout, and now works as an analyst with the NFL Network.

Works

Books
 
  (237 pages)
  (256 pages)
  (238 pages)
  (204 pages)
  (Paperback ) (222 pages)
  (240 pages)
 
  (240 pages)
  (276 pages)
  (203 pages)
  (128 pages)
  (212 pages)
  (208 pages)
  (384 pages)
  (40 pages)
  (96 pages)
  (224 pages)
  (272 pages)
  (323 pages)
  (96 pages)
  (304 pages)
  (205 pages)
  (383 pages)
  (96 pages)
  (216 pages)
  (348 pages)
  (155 pages, made into a 2022 film)
  (257 pages)
  (128 pages)
  (235 pages)
  (293 pages)
  (253 pages)
  (295 pages)
  (2240 pages)
  (293 pages)
  (128 pages)
  (240 pages)

Recordings

 9/11: Our Nation's Emergency Call
 A Bend in the Road: Experiencing God When Your World Caves in
 Best of Christian Living, with Josh McDowell, Ken Hutcherson, and Tim Lahaye
 Jesus' Final Warning: Hearing Christ's Voice in the Midst of Chaos
 What the Bible Says About Angels
 Prayer, the Great Adventure
 Fathers and Daughters
 Christians Have Stress Too
 Raising Well Adjusted Kids (Focus on the Family), with Joe White and James Dobson

Awards and honors

References

External links

 David Jeremiah's blog
 Jeremiah's Turning Point broadcast
 Shadow Mountain Community Church
 Interview with Jeremiah at Premier.tv 

1941 births
Living people
20th-century American male writers
20th-century American non-fiction writers
20th-century Baptists
21st-century American male writers
21st-century American non-fiction writers
21st-century Baptists
American evangelicals
American male non-fiction writers
American television evangelists
Baptists from California
Baptist writers
Cedarville University alumni
Conservatism in the United States
Dallas Theological Seminary alumni
People from El Cajon, California
Southern Baptist ministers
Writers from Toledo, Ohio